is a Japanese actor. He is sometimes referred to as a promotion video actor due to his numerous appearances in promotion videos.

Filmography

Film

Television

References

External links
 Official profile 
 

1980 births
21st-century Japanese male actors
Actors from Kumamoto Prefecture
Japanese male film actors
Japanese male television actors
Living people
Stardust Promotion artists